Vitula setonella is a species of snout moth in the genus Vitula. It was described by James Halliday McDunnough in 1927. It is found in British Columbia, Utah, California and Arizona.

The wingspan is 14–16 mm. The forewings are whitish gray, more or less dusted with blackish scales on the lower half of the wing. The hindwings are semihyaline and whitish. The veins and terminal margin are pale smoky fuscous.

References

Moths described in 1927
Phycitini